Voznesenye is a rural locality (a selo) in Ostrovnoye Rural Settlement of Primorsky District, Arkhangelsk Oblast, Russia. The population was 377 as of 2010. There are 3 streets.

Geography 
Voznesenye is located on the Andrianov island, 25 km northwest of Arkhangelsk (the district's administrative centre) by road. Bolshaya Fyodorovskaya is the nearest rural locality.

References 

Rural localities in Primorsky District, Arkhangelsk Oblast